Cyrtandra waiolani is a species of plant in the family Gesneriaceae. The species was endemic to Koʻolau Range in Hawaii, and is extinct in the wild.

References

Plants described in 1943
waiolani
Endemic flora of Hawaii